Sir Jack Edward Baldwin  (8 August 1938 – 5 January 2020) was a British chemist. He was a Waynflete Professor of Chemistry at the University of Oxford (1978–2005) and head of the organic chemistry at Oxford.

Education 
Baldwin was the second son of Frederick C N Baldwin and Olive F Headland. He was educated at Brighton Grammar School and Lewes County Grammar School. He attended Imperial College, London (BSc, DIC, PhD). He received his Ph.D. working under the direction of Sir Derek H.R. Barton, FRS, Nobel Laureate, who described him as his best student.

Career and Research 
After four years on the staff at Imperial College, Baldwin moved to the United States: first to Pennsylvania State University  in 1967 and then to MIT in 1970, where he published his most significant work — Baldwin's rules for ring closure reactions. It was also where Baldwin met his future wife, Christine Louise Franchi; they married in 1977. In 1978, he moved to Oxford to become head of the Dyson Perrins Laboratory, where he upgraded its facilities and revolutionised the type of work done, while building links between Organic Chemistry and basic biological research. The laboratory formally closed in 2003, but his group moved to the new research facility, the Chemistry Research Laboratory on Mansfield Road.

One of Baldwin's passions was finding out how nature makes chemicals that researchers cannot. This led him to ‘biomimetic’ synthesis: using the principles of nature to improve the generation of biomolecules in the laboratory.

The Baldwin group’s range of interests includes mechanisms of reactions; total synthesis of natural products such as trichoviridin, acromelic acid A, hypoglycin A and lactacystin;  and biomimetic synthesis of natural products such as (-)-xestospongin A. Baldwin published over 700 papers.

Georgina Ferry's obituary of Baldwin notes that "he had little time for the academic conventions of Oxford: he spoke his mind." and that "he enjoyed good food, fine wine, powerful motorbikes, fast cars and his dogs." Some of these aspects of his character are illustrated in a three-part documentary.

Some positions held

Derived from Who's Who 2020.

1963 Assistant Lecturer in Chemistry, Imperial College
1966 Lecturer
1967 Assistant Professor of Chemistry, Penn State
1969 Associate Professor
1969-70 Alfred P. Sloan Fellow
1970 Associate Professor of Chemistry
1972 Daniell Professor of Chemistry, King’s College, London
1972-78 Professor of Chemistry, MIT

Awards and honours 
1975 Corday Morgan Medal and Prize, Chemical Society
1978 Elected a Fellow of the Royal Society
1984 Paul Karrer Gold Medal at the University of Zurich
1987 Hugo Müller Medal, Royal Society of Chemistry
1987 Max Tishler Award, Harvard University
1988 Dr Paul Jansen Prize for Creativity in Organic Synthesis, Belgium
1993 Davy Medal
1994 Elected a Foreign Honorary Member of the American Academy of Arts and Sciences.
1997 Invested as a Knight Bachelor
1999 Leverhulme Medal (Royal Society)
2002 Nakanishi Prize
2006 Paracelsus Prize

References

1938 births
2020 deaths
English chemists
Alumni of Imperial College London
Massachusetts Institute of Technology School of Science faculty
Fellows of Magdalen College, Oxford
Fellows of the American Academy of Arts and Sciences
Fellows of the Royal Society
Waynflete Professors of Chemistry
Knights Bachelor
Members of the Göttingen Academy of Sciences and Humanities